Mike Lewis (born Michael Lewis) is an American saxophonist and bassist from Minneapolis, Minnesota. He is a founding member and saxophonist in contemporary jazz groups Happy Apple and Fat Kid Wednesdays. He also plays electric bass in Alpha Consumer and Redstart.

Lewis has contributed to other projects such as Fog's Ditherer and Gayngs' Relayted. He is currently a member of Andrew Bird's band, as well as Dosh, Bon Iver, and the Tallest Man on Earth.

Discography

Happy Apple
 Blown Shockwaves And Crash Flow (1997)
 Part Of The Solution Problem (1998)
 Body Popping Moon Walking Top Rocking (1999)
 Please Refrain From Fronting (2001)
 Youth Oriented (2003)
 The Peace Between Our Companies (2004)
 Happy Apple Back On Top (2007)
 New York CD (2020)
 Nothin' But Net: Live 1998-2000 (2021)

Fat Kid Wednesdays
 The Art Of Cherry (2004)
 Singles (2006)

Chris Morrissey Quartet
 The Morning World (2009)
 North Hero (2013)

Bryan Nichols Quintet
 Bright Places (2011)

Redstart
 One (2002)
 So Far From Over (2004)

Alpha Consumer
 Alpha Consumer (2006)
 Gary Victorsen's (2008)
 Kick Drugs Out Of America (2011)
 Meat (2014)

Gramma's Boyfriend
 Human Eye (2013)

Gayngs
 Relayted (2010)

Bon Iver
 Bon Iver, Bon Iver (2011)
 22, A Million (2016)
 i,i (2019)

Contributions

Fog
 Ether Teeth (2003)
 Loss Leader (2006)
 Ditherer (2007)
 For Good (2016)

Dosh
 Pure Trash (2004)
 The Lost Take (2006)
 Wolves and Wishes (2008)
 Tommy (2010)
 Milk Money (2013)

Andrew Bird
 Noble Beast (2009)
 Break It Yourself (2012)

Haley Bonar
 Golder (2011)
 Pleasureland (2018)

Other
 The Tallest Man on Earth - Dark Bird Is Home (2015)

References

External links
 
 Official Bon Iver website

Musicians from Minnesota
American male saxophonists
American double-bassists
Male double-bassists
Living people
Bon Iver members
21st-century American saxophonists
21st-century double-bassists
21st-century American male musicians
Year of birth missing (living people)
Gayngs members